This article displays the qualifying draw for the Men's Doubles at the 2001 US Open.

Seeds

Qualifiers

Qualifying draw

First qualifier

Second qualifier

Third qualifier

Fourth qualifier

References
2001 US Open – Men's draws and results at the International Tennis Federation

Men's Doubles Qualifying
US Open (tennis) by year – Qualifying